"God Really Loves Us" is a song performed by Crowder and Dante Bowe featuring Maverick City Music. It was released on June 3, 2022, as the third single from Crowder's fourth studio album, Milk & Honey (2021). Crowder co-wrote the song with Ben Glover, Dante Bowe, and Jeff Sojka.

"God Really Loves Us" peaked at No. 9 on the US Hot Christian Songs chart, and No. 1 on the Hot Gospel Songs chart. The song was nominated for the Grammy Award for Best Contemporary Christian Music Performance/Song at the 2023 Grammy Awards.

Background
"God Really Loves Us" was initially released as the seventh track on Crowder's album, Milk & Honey, on June 11, 2021. On June 3, 2022, Crowder and Dante Bowe released the radio version of "God Really Loves Us" on digital formats, becoming the third single from the album, following "Good God Almighty" and "In the House".

Composition

Reception

Critical response
Timothy Yap of JubileeCast said of the song: "One of the soon-to-be-classic-worship-tune is the sublime "God Really Loves Us." Teaming up with Dante Bowe and Maverick City Music, "God Really Loves Us" begins softly before exploding into a dynamic full-Gospel-choir celebration." Reviewing for Jesus Freak Hideout, John Underdown explicitly listed "God Really Loves Us" as one of the songs from Milk & Honey which were earworms and had lyrics with some powerful moments. Kelly Meade of Today's Christian Entertainment opined that "This ballad stands out with its emotionally moving piano arrangement & choir-like backing vocals."

Awards and nominations

Commercial performance
Following the album's release, "God Really Loves Us" debuted at No. 11 on the US Gospel Digital Song Sales chart dated June 26, 2021. "God Really Loves Us" made its debut at No. 45 on the US Christian Airplay chart dated June 25, 2022. After being released to Christian radio, "God Really Loves Us" debuted at No. 46 on the US Hot Christian Songs chart, and No. 25 on the Hot Gospel Songs chart, dated July 9, 2022.

Music videos
On June 11, 2021, Crowder released the lyric video for "God Really Loves Us" through YouTube. On June 3, 2022, Crowder released the audio video for the radio version of the song via YouTube.

On August 12, 2022, Crowder published the official music video for "God Really Loves Us" with Dante Bowe featuring Maverick City Music on YouTube. The music video, directed by Patrick Tohill, was filmed on a rooftop in downtown Atlanta as the three acts performed the song at sunset.

Charts

Weekly charts

Year-end charts

Release history

Other versions
 Passion released a version of the song featuring Crowder and Chidima on their live album, Burn Bright (2022).

References

External links
 
 

2021 songs
2022 singles
Capitol Records singles
Crowder (musician) songs
Dante Bowe songs
Maverick City Music songs
Sparrow Records singles
Songs written by Ben Glover
Songs written by Dante Bowe